In general, a node is a localized swelling (a "knot") or a point of intersection (a vertex).

Node may refer to:

In mathematics
Vertex (graph theory), a vertex in a mathematical graph
Vertex (geometry), a point where two or more curves, lines, or edges meet.
Node (autonomous system), behaviour for an ordinary differential equation near a critical point
Singular point of an algebraic variety, a type of singular point of a curve

In science and engineering

Astronomy
Orbital node, the points where an orbit crosses a plane of reference
 Lunar node, where the orbits of the sun and moon intersect
 Longitude of the ascending node, how orbital nodes are parameterized

Biology
Lymph node, an immune system organ used to store white blood cells
Node of Ranvier, periodic gaps in the insulating myelin sheaths of myelinated axons
Sinoatrial node and atrioventricular node, specialized tissues in the heart responsible for initiating and coordinating the heartbeat
Primitive knot or primitive node, the organizer tissue for gastrulation in vertebrates
The place on a plant stem where a leaf is attached
In Cladistics, a shared ancestor (also see Clade)

Computing and electronics
Node (networking), a point of connection in a communication network
An entity in a mesh network
Node (circuits), a region in an electrical circuit where there is no change in potential
Node (computer science), a basic unit used to build data structures
Goal node (computer science), a node in a graph that meets defined criteria for success or termination
Node (UML), the representation of a computational device in the Unified Modeling Language
Node.js, a JavaScript-based, cross-platform runtime environment
NodeB, hardware that is connected to the mobile phone network
NODE (wireless sensor), a wireless handheld sensor for smart devices
Node, a shorthand used to designate a semiconductor fabrication process

Linguistics
Node (linguistics), a branch point in the Tree model, or Node Theory, of language evolution

Physics
Node (physics), a point along a standing wave where the wave has minimal amplitude

Space-station modules
 Unity (ISS module) or Node 1, one of the first modules of the International Space Station
 Harmony (ISS module) or Node 2, module of the International Space Station
 Tranquility (ISS module) or Node 3, a module of the International Space Station with the Cupola
 Node 4, a proposed module of the International Space Station
 Prichal (ISS module), a planned module of the International Space Station to be launched in 2021

In music
Node (band), Italian death metal band
Node (singer), Danish singer and hip hop artist of Kurdish origin
Node (album), a 2015 album by Australian metalcore band Northlane

Other uses
Node, Kentucky
Node tribe, a community of pastoral nomads in India and Pakistan
Node, a transport hub in a transportation system
Giordana Racing Team, a British cycling team, formerly named Node4-Giordana
Node Magazine, a literary project based on the novel Spook Country by William Gibson
New Oxford Dictionary of English, a single-volume English language dictionary, see Oxford Dictionary of English
Node, a cyborg with a donated human face used as a guide, in "Silence in the Library" (Doctor Who)
Node, the pommel-like part of a chalice where the stem meets the cup
A nodal organizational structure, such as in terms of business management, see Cellular organizational structure

See also 
Nodal (disambiguation)
Nodule (disambiguation)

eu:Nodo
pt:Nós